Spinney Hill is an area of Northampton, England, to the north of the town, in the Parklands ward. It is bordered by a semi-wild  park area called Bradlaugh Fields, another more traditional park, allotments and a residential area.

Amenities include shops, a pub (called "The Spinney Hill"), Northampton School for Girls, a comprehensive secondary school with academy status, and  primary and nursery schools.

The Post Office has relocated to Sweet Machine on Churchill Avenue.

The population is included in the Eastfield ward of Northampton Council.

History 
Sir Philip Manfield (a shoe manufacturer)  had a substantial mansion built on Kettering Road for himself and his family between 1899 and 1902. James Manfield gave the house for a hospital and it opened as a "hospital for crippled children." It became an orthopedic hospital for all ages and closed as a hospital in 1992. The main building was then converted into apartments and renamed "Manfield Grange".

The Spinney Hill pub was built in 1936 by the Northampton Brewery Company. From 1937 until 1947 their tenants were Bertha Wilmott, a singing star of variety theatre and radio, and her husband Reg Seymour. At that time it was a hotel offering accommodation and a famous hotel guest in 1943 was Hollywood film star Clark Gable, while he was a captain in the US army.

Areas of Northampton